Surround sound is a type of multichannel audio.

Surround may refer to:

Surround channels, audio channels in surround sound
Surround Video, Microsoft program for creating 3D images
Surround session, online advertising technique in which one advertiser dominates a website
Surround (album), an album by Jon Bauer
Surround (video game), an Atari 2600 video game cartridge
Surround (horse), Australian racehorse
"Surround", a 2001 song by American Hi-Fi from American Hi-Fi
"Surround", a 1992 song by Dada from Puzzle